The Chuck Taylor Most Valuable Player Award was created to honor the most outstanding player for the NAIA Men's Division I National Championship Tournament. Established in 1939, it has been awarded every year with the exception of 1944.

Chuck Taylor Most Valuable Player

See also
 NCAA basketball tournament Most Outstanding Player

References

Most Valuable
College basketball trophies and awards in the United States
Awards established in 1939
1939 establishments in the United States